The United States secretary of energy is the head of the United States Department of Energy, a member of the Cabinet of the United States, and fifteenth in the presidential line of succession. The position was created on October 1, 1977, when President Jimmy Carter signed the Department of Energy Organization Act, establishing the department. The energy secretary and the department originally focused on energy production and regulation. The emphasis soon shifted to developing technology for better and more efficient energy sources, as well as energy education. After the end of the Cold War, the department's attention also turned toward radioactive waste disposal and the maintenance of environmental quality. 
Former secretary of defense James Schlesinger served as the first secretary of energy. As a Republican nominated to the post by Democratic president Jimmy Carter, Schlesinger's appointment marks the only time a president has chosen a member of another political party for the position. Schlesinger is also the only secretary to be dismissed from the post. Hazel O'Leary, Bill Clinton's first secretary of energy, was the first female and first African American to hold the position. The first Hispanic to serve as Energy Secretary was Clinton's second energy secretary, Federico Peña. Spencer Abraham became the first Arab American to hold the position on January 20, 2001, serving under the administration of George W. Bush. Steven Chu became the first Asian American to hold the position on January 20, 2009, serving under president Barack Obama. Chu was also the longest-serving secretary of energy and the first individual to join the Cabinet after having received a Nobel Prize.

President Joe Biden's nominee to be Secretary of Energy, former Michigan governor Jennifer Granholm, was confirmed on February 25, 2021. Granholm is the second woman to lead the Department of Energy.

Nuclear weapons
In addition to responsibilities related to generation and use of energy, the secretary is the most senior official other than the president of the United States or Secretary of Defense with primary responsibility for the nation's ~3,800 viable nuclear weapons. This arrangement is intended to maintain full civilian control over strategic weapons, except as directed by the president for specific military uses. The department of energy is responsible for the building, maintenance, and disposal of all nuclear weapons within the United States' arsenal in addition to safeguarding these weapons when they are not actively deployed in military service. Under the terms of several successive treaties, most recently New START, the United States has reduced its strategic arsenal to 1500 deployed weapons. Consequently, many older legacy weapons systems have been dismantled or scheduled for dismantlement, with their core radioactive fuel - generally plutonium - being reprocessed into reactor-grade or space exploration fuel.

List of secretaries of energy
 Parties
 (7)  (9)

Status

See also
 United States Secretary of Transportation
 White House Office of Energy and Climate Change Policy

References

External links

|-

Energy ministers
Energy

Energy